As there is more than one Georgia, there are two lists of Georgian cities.

List of cities and towns in Georgia (country)
List of municipalities in Georgia (U.S. state)